Vatupilei is a village in Guadalcanal, Solomon Islands. It is located near Aruliho,  by road northwest of Honiara.

References

Populated places in Guadalcanal Province